Sergei Prokofiev's Piano Sonata No. 5 in C Major, Opus 38, was written at Ettal near Oberammergau in the Bavarian Alps during the composer's stay there in 1923. He would revise it thirty years later, at the end of his life, but not drastically, as his Opus 135, and it is this version that is usually played. The work is dedicated it to Pierre Souvtchinski, a musicologist and friend. All eight of Prokofiev's other piano sonatas were written in Russia. The revisions to this piece, made in 1952–53 in Russia, are mostly in the last movement.

Movements
Allegro tranquillo
Andantino
Un poco allegretto

References

External links

Video - Prokofiev Piano Sonata No 5 - Complete (16:27). 
Prokofiev Piano Sonata No 5 in C major, Opus 38 (1923).
Video - Prokofiev Piano Sonata No 5 (1923) mvt 1 (05:36).
Video - Prokofiev Piano Sonata No 5 (1923) mvt 2 (03:56).
Video - Prokofiev Piano Sonata No 5 (1923) mvt 3 (04:38).
Prokofiev Piano Sonata No 5 in C major, Opus 135 (1952–53).
Video - Prokofiev Piano Sonata No 5 (1952-53) mvt 1 (06:22).
Video - Prokofiev Piano Sonata No 5 (1952-53) mvt 2 (04:41).
Video - Prokofiev Piano Sonata No 5 (1952-53) mvt 3 (05:32).

Compositions by Sergei Prokofiev
Piano sonatas by Sergei Prokofiev
20th-century classical music
1923 compositions
1952 compositions
Compositions in C major
Music with dedications
Piano compositions in the 20th century